Ekow Panyin Okyere Eduamoah is a Ghanaian politician and a  member of parliament representing Gomoa East constituency in the Central region of Ghana.

Early life and education 
Ekow was born on 3 November 1972 in Potsin, a town in the Central Region of Ghana.He is a graduate of the University of Cape Coast where he obtained a Diploma in Management Studies in 2006.

Politics 
He is member of National Democratic Congress. He was first elected as member of the parliament to represent Gomoa East Constituency in the 2008 Ghanaian General Elections. He thus represented the constituency in the 5th parliament of the 4th republic. He was elected with 18,908 votes out of the 35,212total valid votes cast, equivalent to 53.70% of total valid votes cast. He was elected over Richmond Sam Quarm of the New Patriotic Party, Kofi Otu of the Democratic Freedom Party and Richmond K. Anwumanyi Grant of the Convention People's Party. These obtained 37.77%, 0.76% and 7.78% respectively of total valid votes cast. He also won his re-election bid into the office in the 2012 General Elections but lost his third re-election bid into the office in 2016 General Elections. He was a committee member on Gender and Children, Employment, Social Welfare and State, Public Accounts. He was succeeded in office by kojo Asemanyi of the New Patriotic Party.

Employment 
He is an educationist/teacher and was the proprietor of Multi-Care Preparatory School in Gomoa-Potsin.

Personal life 
Ekow is married with two children. He is a Christian (Methodist).

References 

1972 births
Ghanaian MPs 2017–2021
National Democratic Congress (Ghana) politicians
Living people
University of Cape Coast alumni
People from Central Region (Ghana)